Boxer is a character from George Orwell's 1945 novel Animal Farm. He is shown as the farm's  dedicated and loyal  laborer. Boxer serves as an allegory for the Russian working-class who helped to oust Tsar Nicholas and establish the Soviet Union, but were eventually betrayed by the government under Joseph Stalin.

He is described as "faithful and strong"; and he believes any problem can be solved if he works harder. David Low used a cart horse as a symbol for the T.U.C. in cartoons for many years before Orwell began to write Animal Farm.

Boxer can only remember four letters of the alphabet at a time, but sees the importance of education and aspires to learn the rest of the alphabet during his retirement (which never happens). Boxer is a loyal supporter of Napoleon, and he listens to everything the self-appointed ruler of the farm says and assumes, sometimes with doubt, that everything Napoleon tells the farm animals is true, hence "Napoleon is always right."

Boxer's strength plays a huge part in keeping Animal Farm together prior to his death: the rest of the animals trusted in it to keep their spirits high during the long and hard laborious winters. Boxer was the only close friend of Benjamin, the cynical donkey.

Boxer fights in the Battle of the Cowshed and the Battle of the Windmill. Though he dislikes humans, he kicks a stable boy during a fight. Boxer believes that he has killed the boy which Boxer hates himself for doing, thinking that he went too far (shortly afterward, it revealed the boy was only stunned, and soon fled to freedom). When Boxer defends Snowball's reputation from Squealer's revisionism, the pigs designate him as a target for the Great Purge. However, when the dogs attack, Boxer pins one under his hooves, causing the other dogs to flee and the captured dog spared at Napoleon's request. When he collapses from overwork, the pigs say they have sent him to a veterinarian, when they have sent him to the knacker's yard to be slaughtered, in exchange for money to buy a case of whiskey for the pigs to drink. Benjamin, who is described as "devoted to Boxer," recognizes that the dogcart Boxer is taken away in is the knacker's; however, Squealer deceives the other animals by saying that the dogcart was possessed by a veterinarian who failed to repaint the dogcart. Squealer concocts a sentimental tale of the death of Boxer, saying that he was given the best medical care possible, paid for by the "compassionate" Napoleon. Boxer's death is turned into a day of honoring him. Squealer says that his sayings, "Comrade Napoleon is always right" and "I will work harder!" should live on in all the animals; ergo another excuse to make the animals work even harder.

During Old Major's speech, which inspired the principles of Animalism, a specific reference is made to how Boxer would be turned into glue under Farmer Jones' rule, thus implying that it would not happen to him under Animalism. "You, Boxer, the very day that those great muscles of yours lose their power, Jones will send you to the knacker, who will cut your throat and boil you down for the fox-hounds."

Real life model
Boxer is based on a coal miner named Alexey Stakhanov who was famous for working over his quota. The Joseph Stalin Regime built a cult of personality around him that rewarded workers who showed a similar heroic dedication to production and efficiency. Boxer supported Napoleon and also was very loyal to his kind. Unlike Boxer, Stakhanov was allowed to retire and ultimately outlived Stalin.

Films
In the 1954 film adaptation of Animal Farm, Boxer is voiced by Maurice Denham. In the 1999 film adaptation, he is voiced by Paul Scofield.

See also
 List of fictional horses

References

Animal Farm characters
Literary characters introduced in 1945
Fictional horses
Fictional revolutionaries
Male characters in literature